Abdul Faseeh (born 2 August 2003) is a Pakistani cricketer. He made his first-class debut on 17 November 2021, for Northern in the 2021–22 Quaid-e-Azam Trophy. In December 2021, he was named in Pakistan's team for the 2022 ICC Under-19 Cricket World Cup in the West Indies.

References

External links
 

2003 births
Living people
Pakistani cricketers
Place of birth missing (living people)